

Indigo Diaz

Indigo Dunham Diaz (born October 14, 1998) is a Canadian professional baseball pitcher in the New York Yankees organization.

Diaz played Little League baseball with the Forest Hills team, then participated in the British Columbia Premier Baseball League as a member of the North Shore Twins and Coquitlam Reds. He attended Handsworth Secondary School, and continued playing baseball. Diaz began his collegiate baseball career at Iowa Western Community College, where he pitched two seasons, then transferred to the Michigan State Spartans baseball team. In the midst of his junior season with the Spartans, Diaz became the team's closer. Diaz was subsequently selected by the Atlanta Braves in the 27th round of the 2019 Major League Baseball draft. Diaz started his professional career with the Gulf Coast League Braves after signing with the Atlanta Braves organization. Due to the COVID-19 pandemic the 2020 minor league season was cancelled. Diaz began the 2021 season at the High-A level with the Rome Braves. He threw 18 walks over 18 relief appearances, spanning 27 innings.  Diaz was promoted to the Mississippi Braves in July 2021. Diaz spent the 2022 season with Mississippi, and was traded to the New York Yankees, alongside Caleb Durbin, for Lucas Luetge.

References

External links

Michigan State Spartans bio
Diaz at Iowa Western: 1 and 2

Canadian expatriate baseball players in the United States
Baseball people from British Columbia
Iowa Western Reivers baseball players
Michigan State Spartans baseball players
Gulf Coast Braves players
Rome Braves players
Mississippi Braves players
Peoria Javelinas players
1998 births
Living people
2023 World Baseball Classic players